The Judeo-Iranian languages (or dialects) are a number of related Jewish variants of Iranian languages spoken throughout the formerly extensive realm of the Persian Empire. Judeo-Iranian dialects are generally conservative in comparison with those of their Muslim neighbours. Judeo-Shirazi, for example, remains close to the language of Hafez.

Like most Jewish languages, all the Judeo-Iranian languages contain great numbers of Hebrew loanwords, and are written using variations of the Hebrew alphabet. Another name used for some Judeo-Iranian dialects is Latorayi, sometimes interpreted by folk etymology as "not [the language] of the Torah".  This refers to a form of the language in which the number of Hebrew and Aramaic loanwords is deliberately maximised to allow it to function as a secret code.  In general, however, the number of such loanwords is small compared with that in other Jewish languages such as Yiddish or Judaeo-Spanish.

The languages include:

 Dzhidi (literary Judeo-Persian)
 Luterā'i (a secret language combining an Aramaic and Hebrew vocabulary with Persian conjunctions and grammatical morphemes)
 Bukhori (Judeo-Bukharic, Judeo-Tajik, the Jewish language of the distinctive Jewish community centered in Bukhara)
 Judeo-Golpaygani (the Judeo-Persian language traditionally spoken in the environs of Gulpaigan and western Isfahan Province, Iran)
 Judeo-Yazdi = Judeo-Kermani (spoken in the environs of Yazd and elsewhere in Yazd Province, in central Iran; in Kerman and elsewhere in Kerman Province, in south-central Iran)
 Judeo-Shirazi (spoken in Shiraz and elsewhere in Fars Province, in southwestern Iran)
 Judeo-Esfahani (spoken in Isfahan and environs, as well as elsewhere in central and southern Isfahan Province, Iran)
 Judeo-Hamedani (spoken in Hamadan and elsewhere in Hamadan Province, in western Iran)
 Judeo-Kashani (spoken in Kashan, Abyaneh, and elsewhere in northern Isfahan Province, in western Iran)
 Luflā'i (a Kashani variant of Luterā'i)
 Judeo-Borujerdi (spoken in Borujerd and elsewhere in Lorestan Province, in western Iran)
 Judeo-Nehevandi (spoken in Nahavand and elsewhere in northern Hamadan Province, in western Iran)
 Judeo-Khunsari (spoken in Khansar and elsewhere in far-western Isfahan Province, in western Iran)
 Juhuri (Judæo-Tat) (A Jewish-Tat dialect spoken in the Republic of Azerbaijan, Dagestan (North Caucasus).
 Judeo-Aramaic (not to be confused with several Jewish Neo-Aramaic languages.

See also
 Jews in Iran
 Jewish languages

References

External links
Jewish dialect of Isfahan, Encyclopedia Iranica
Article from Jewish Languages site

 
Endangered Iranian languages
Jews and Judaism in Persia and Iran